Leptophobia micaia is a butterfly in the family Pieridae. It is found in Colombia.

References

Pierini
Butterflies described in 2004